The Mangakarengorengo River is a river of the Bay of Plenty Region of New Zealand. It is a tributary of the Wairoa River.

See also
List of rivers of New Zealand

References

Rivers of the Bay of Plenty Region
Rivers of New Zealand